Sean McAdam may refer to:

 Sean McAdam (journalist), United States sports writer
 Sean McAdam (politician), Canadian politician